The Dodokan River is a river that flows in the island of Lombok, in West Nusa Tenggara, Indonesia.

Course
The furthest headwaters of the Dodokan originates from Batukliang, Central Lombok Regency, and flows in a westerly direction. During the course of the river, there are two dams that had been erected - the Batujai Dam and then the Pengga Dam. After the Pengga Dam, it flows for a further 23.3 km before reaching the Lombok Strait. Its total length is 64 km.

Watershed
Dodokan's watershed is the largest by area in Lombok Island, with a total area of 578.62 km2 and covering much of the southwestern portion of the island. Aside from the major dams along the main course, there are tens of smaller retention basin in the watershed.

Use
The river mouth, which includes a mangrove forest, is a local tourist destination, due to relatively clear waters and extensive surrounding vegetation.

References

Rivers of Lombok